Imad Al-Dossari (born 4 June 1985) is a Saudi football player. He currently plays for Tabarjal as a goalkeeper.

References

1985 births
Living people
Saudi Arabian footballers
Al-Fayha FC players
Al-Taawoun FC players
Al-Tai FC players
Al-Wehda Club (Mecca) players
Al-Washm Club players
Al-Lewaa Club players
Al-Okhdood Club players
Al-Najma SC players
Tabarjal FC players
Saudi First Division League players
Saudi Professional League players
Saudi Second Division players
Saudi Fourth Division players
Association football goalkeepers